On the Run (Chinese: 亡命鴛鴦) is a 1988 Hong Kong action thriller film directed by Alfred Cheung. The film stars Yuen Biao, Pat Ha and Charlie Chin.

Plot
Chui Pai (Pat Ha) is a dangerous killer who shot a woman during the night and lives with her daughter. She has been hunted for many years and cannot stop hiding. Heung Ming (Yuen Biao) is a police officer has been doing his job poorly. His wife was killed in a restaurant and the police accuse him of his wife's murder. Things become even more complicated for Heung as he discovers that she and he are now targeted by detectives led by Superintendent Lui (Charlie Chin), seeking to cover evidence of their own drug crimes. Framed for murder, Heung rapidly runs out of options as the killers target his elderly mother and young daughter. Wounded, Heung is forced to rely on the assassin Pai, who slowly warms up to him while caring for him and his young daughter. They have to stick together as long as they can until they die or are taken under custody.

Cast
Yuen Biao as Heung Ming
Pat Ha as Chui Pai
Charlie Chin as Superintendent Lui
Lo Lieh as Hsi
Philip Ko as No-hands policeman
Yuen Wah as Cowardly policeman
Idy Chan as Inspector Lo Huan
Chan Cheuk-yas Lin (Pai's daughter)
Lee Heung-kam as Heung's mother
Lawerance Lau as Heung's brother
Orlando To as Hao
Lam Lap-san as Hui
Peter Ngor as Unce Lu
Bowie Lam as Johnny
May Cheung as Fong
Peter Pau as Doctor
Chow Kam-kong as Cop
Kwan Yung as Cop
Pang Yun-cheung as Cop
Ng Kwok-kin as Ling (Drug Squad member)
Yau Kam-hung

See also
List of Hong Kong films
Yuen Biao filmography

External links

1988 films
1988 action thriller films
Hong Kong action thriller films
Police detective films
1980s Cantonese-language films
Golden Harvest films
Films set in Hong Kong
Films shot in Hong Kong
Films about contract killing
1980s chase films
1980s Hong Kong films